Rivals is a 1972 American drama film written and directed by Krishna Shah. The film stars Joan Hackett, Robert Klein, Scott Jacoby, Jeanne Tanzy Williams, Glen Hayes and Phoebe Dorin. The film was released on August 23, 1972, by AVCO Embassy Pictures.

Plot

Cast     
Joan Hackett as Christine
Robert Klein as Peter
Scott Jacoby as Jamie
Jeanne Tanzy Williams as Mary 
Glen Hayes as Douglas
Phoebe Dorin as Madge
James Karen as Child Psychiatrist
Randy Digeronimo as Tony
Frank Fiore as Phil
Bill Herndon as Bob
William Shust as Culloux
Leib Lensky as Rabbi
Viola Swayne as Mrs. Sturgess
Craig Noel as Salesman
Iris Whitney as Matron
Ann Miles as Girl

References

External links 
 

1972 films
American drama films
1972 drama films
Embassy Pictures films
1970s English-language films
1970s American films
1972 directorial debut films